Lee In-su (born 1 October 1973) is a South Korean rower. He competed at the 1996 Summer Olympics and the 2000 Summer Olympics.

References

1973 births
Living people
South Korean male rowers
Olympic rowers of South Korea
Rowers at the 1996 Summer Olympics
Rowers at the 2000 Summer Olympics
Place of birth missing (living people)